{{DISPLAYTITLE:C7H12O4}}
The molecular formula C7H12O4 (molar mass: 160.17 g/mol, exact mass: 160.0736 u) may refer to:

 Diethyl malonate (DEM)
 Pimelic acid

Molecular formulas